Elm Grove (also Elmgrove) is within Wheeling city limits in Ohio County, West Virginia, United States. It lies at an elevation of 774 feet (236 m).

The Elm Grove Stone Arch Bridge, the oldest surviving bridge in the U.S. state of West Virginia, is located in Elm Grove.

Elm Grove is home to the Shepherd Hall (Monument Place), a historic house.

References

Unincorporated communities in Ohio County, West Virginia
Unincorporated communities in West Virginia